Ramingining is an Aboriginal Australian community of mainly Yolngu people in the Northern Territory, Australia,  east of Darwin. It is on the edge of the Arafura Swamp in Arnhem Land. Wulkabimirri is a tiny outstation (homeland) nearby, and Murwangi, further south, is part of the Ramingining Homelands. Marwuyu Gulparil, also known as Gulparil Marwuyu or just Marwuyu, is another remote community to the south of Ramingining.

History
The community was established in the early 1970s, and became recognised as Aboriginal land with the passage of the Aboriginal Land Rights Act 1976. The place name was registered as an administrative area in 2007.

The village, along with nearby Murwangi (formerly Arafura Station, now part of Ramingining Homelands), was the source for many of the actors in the 2006 film Ten Canoes. After the film sparked worldwide interest in Yolngu and Australian Aboriginal culture, a spin-off educational project known as Twelve Canoes was created, in collaboration with the people at Ramingining, which includes a website and twelve short films. The film of the twelve segments was shown on SBS TV in Australia, and has been available online.

Demographics
The population of the village in the 2016 Australian census was 811. Djambarrpuyngu is the main language in Ramingining, though Gupapuyngu, Ganalbingu, Liyagalawumirr 3.2% and Burarra are also spoken. The "SA1" geographical regions defined by the Australian Bureau of Statistics, including  Ramingining and the tiny Wulkabimirri community, recorded a population of 1025.

Outstations
There are a number of tiny remote settlements, also known as outstations or homelands, scattered around Ramningining. These include Wulkabimirri, which is nearby; Murwangi, further south; and Marwuyu Gulparil (aka Gulparil Marwuyu, or just Marwuyu), that takes an hour-and-a-half in a four-wheel drive and boat, south of Ramingining. Marwuyu is known for being the homeland of famous actor and dancer David Gulpilil.

Description and facilities
A written permit is required to visit Ramingining. Alcohol is banned in Ramingining. It cannot be consumed by residents or visitors. Kava used to be legally available, but was banned in the entire Northern Territory in August 2007 as a part of the federal government's intervention on Indigenous affairs.

The village has an airstrip (Ramingining Airport) serviced by Fly Tiwi, a general store, a school, a police station, and a health clinic. The health clinic transitioned to a community-managed model in 2018, and is managed by Miwatj Health Aboriginal Corporation.

Ramingining school is paired with a sister school in Cockatoo, Victoria, Cockatoo Primary School. Exchange visits are organised where groups of Year 5 pupils and accompanying teachers visit Ramingining for a week. A few weeks or months later, Ramingining students from Year 5 and 6 visit Cockatoo Primary School.

A program that started in 2009 saw year nine boys from St Kevin's College in Melbourne  visit Ramingining, which started a regular exchange program. Loreto Mandeville Hall in Melbourne also runs an exchange program.

Tourism
The Northern Territory Government has provided several infrastructure grants for tourism projects in the region, which is part of the Government's plan to help drive tourism in northern parts of the state.

References

External links
Google Maps

Aboriginal communities in the Northern Territory